Comines-Warneton is a city and municipality of Wallonia located in the province of Hainaut, Belgium. 

On January 1, 2006, it had a total population of 17,562. The name "Comines" is believed to have a Celtic, or Gaulish, origin. Comines-Warneton is a municipality with language facilities for Dutch-speakers.

The municipality consists of the following districts: Bas-Warneton,  Comines, Houthem, Ploegsteert, and Warneton (including the  hamlet of Gheer). They were all transferred in 1963 from the arrondissement of Ypres in the Dutch-speaking province of West Flanders to the newly created arrondissement of Mouscron in French-speaking Hainaut. The five municipalities (Comines, Houthem, Ploegsteert, Bas-Warneton, Warneton) were merged into a single Comines-Warneton municipality in 1977. Since then, the municipality forms an exclave of both Hainaut and Wallonia, being surrounded by the Flemish province of West Flanders and the French department of Nord and not connected to the rest of the French-speaking area of Belgium.

Comines-Warneton is twinned with Hedge End in England and with Argenton-les-Vallées in France.

Famous inhabitants
Johannes Despauterius, humanist
Frank Vandenbroucke, cyclist
Gustave Singier, painter
Eugene Joseph Verboeckhoven, painter

Twin towns

 Hedge End, England
 Wolverton, England

See also
Voeren, a similarly detached part of Flanders.

References

External links

Local website in French
 Local economic website in French

 
Cities in Wallonia
Municipalities of Hainaut (province)
Belgium–France border crossings
Divided cities
Enclaves and exclaves